The 1962 Stanford Indians football team represented Stanford University in the 1962 NCAA University Division football season. Stanford was led by fifth-year head coach Jack Curtice and home games were played on campus at Stanford Stadium in Stanford, California.

Following the season, Curtice was fired after failing to produce a winning season in five years.

Schedule

Players drafted by the NFL/AFL

References

External links
 Game program: Stanford vs. Washington State at Spokane – October 13, 1962

Stanford
Stanford Cardinal football seasons
Stanford Indians football